Bay Ridge Christian College is an unaccredited, historically black college located in unincorporated Fort Bend County, Texas, United States, north of Kendleton and west of Beasley. This two-year Christian junior college, offers a college credit program (a two-year Ministerial Certificate) and a continuing education program called the Ministry and Leadership Development Institute.

Academics
Bay Ridge is a two-year liberal arts junior college that provides an alternative college experience for students who may not be prepared to attend a four-year college or university. Bay Ridge graduates may transfer to four-year universities or colleges to pursue their bachelor's degree pursuant to their admission/transfer policies.

Currently, the college does not hold accreditation, but is seeking degree-granting authority and accreditation with the Texas Higher Education Coordinating Board (THECB) and the Southern Association of Colleges and Schools (SACS).

Certification programs
 Business
 Entrepreneurship
 Education
 Allied Health Care
 Ministry
 Logistics and transportation
 Specialized Technology

History
Bay Ridge Christian College was founded by Dr. James Horace Germany in 1953 in Union, Mississippi to prepare African-American leadership for both urban and rural churches and the communities they serve.

After several years of operating the college in Mississippi, he moved the college to Kendleton, Texas after being beaten by members of the white Citizens Council of Senatobia and local Klansmen.

On September 27, 2008, the college's Board of Trustees announced that Bay Ridge Christian College would become a two-year residential Christian junior college for African-American males.

Campus

The Bay Ridge Christian College campus is located on FM 2919 outside of Kendleton, Texas, near the San Bernard River. The closest major city is Houston, Texas.

Intercollegiate athletics
Bay Ridge Christian College formerly competed in the Association of Christian College Athletics (ACCA), in men's basketball. The school's colors are Royal blue, gold, and white and the nickname is the Eagles.

References

Further reading
 Germany, Horace  At Any Cost, (Anderson, Indiana: Warner Press, 2000)

External links
 bayridgecollege.org archive.org archive of defunct web site

Unaccredited Christian universities and colleges in the United States
Private universities and colleges in Texas
Educational institutions established in 1953
Education in Fort Bend County, Texas
Buildings and structures in Fort Bend County, Texas
1953 establishments in Texas
Two-year colleges in the United States